Christos Markogiannakis (Greek: Χρήστος Μαρκογιαννάκης) (born 28 January 1980) is a Greek novelist and criminartist, based in Paris, France. His work includes crime fiction and non-fiction. His books are published in Greek, French, English and German. He is a member of the Crime Writers’ Association.

Career 

Christos Markogiannakis studied Law and Criminology in Greece and France. He worked as a criminal lawyer in Crete and currently lives in Paris. 
He is the creator of the term Criminart, a theoretical mix of art and crime, focusing on the representation of murder in works of art and on murder as a form of art, according to the disciplines of Thomas De Quincey.
His criminartistic book Scènes de Crime au Louvre / The Louvre Murder Club (Le Passage Editions, 2017), where he analyses paintings, sculptures and ancient Greek amphorae in the Louvre Museum in Paris, was awarded the 2017 French Prize for Literary Essay (Prix National du Document Littéraire). The book was welcomed by the Press for its original point of view. 

The Louvre Murder Club was followed by Scènes de Crime à Orsay / The Orsay Murder Club in 2018 (Le Passage Editions, 2018) with works of art from the Orsay Museum in Paris.

His crime fiction takes place in contemporary Greece and follows the investigations of a Police Captain, Christophoros Markou. His writing style is inspired by Agatha Christie , and his books are a hybrid between a Whodunit and a Mediterranean Noir, focusing on the investigation, the psychology of the characters and current social conditions. 

His first crime novel Au 5e étage de la faculté de droit (Editions Albin Michel, 2018) received the prize of the Académie du Var in 2018.

Publications 	

Scènes de crime au Louvre (Le Passage, 2017)

The Louvre Murder Club (Le Passage, 2017)

Au 5e étage de la faculté de droit (broché) (Albin Michel, 2018) Au 5e étage de la faculté de droit (poche) (Livre de Poche, 2020) 

Scènes de crime à Orsay (Le Passage, 2018)

The Orsay Murder Club (Le Passage, 2018)

Mourir en scène (Albin Michel, 2020)

Μυθιστόρημα με Κλειδί (Εκδόσεις Μίνωας 2021)

Στον 5ο όροφο της Νομικής (Εκδόσεις Μίνωας 2022)

Qui a tué Lucy Davis? (Plon 2022)

Mord unter griechischer Sonne (OKTOPUS bei Kampa 2022)

References

External links  

 Official website

1980 births
Living people
Greek writers
Greek novelists